Camnet Internet Service is an Internet service provider operated by the Ministry of Posts and Telecommunications of Cambodia.  Camnet was established in 1997 by the Cambodian government and Telecom Cambodia with the support of the International Development Research Centre of Canada.  Camnet was the first Internet service provider in Cambodia.  Its main offices are located in Phnom Penh.

See also
 Communications in Cambodia
 Internet

References

External links
 Camnet official site

Government-owned companies of Cambodia
Telecommunications companies of Cambodia
Internet service providers
Government agencies established in 1997
Phnom Penh